Tinissa insignis is a moth of the family Tineidae. It was described by Zagulajev in 1972. It is found on Java.

References

Moths described in 1972
Scardiinae